Yugoslavia competed at the 1976 Winter Paralympics in Örnsköldsvik, Sweden. Nine competitors from Yugoslavia
competed in two sports but did not win a medal. The country finished 10th in the medal table.

Alpine skiing 

Five athletes competed in alpine skiing:

 Ivo Bevc
 Franc Cehovin
 Drago Kobler
 Franc Komar
 Sasa Panowski

No medals were won.

Cross-country 

Four athletes competed in cross-country skiing. No medals were won.

See also 

 Yugoslavia at the Paralympics
 Yugoslavia at the 1976 Winter Olympics

References 

Yugoslavia at the Paralympics
1976 in Yugoslav sport
Nations at the 1976 Winter Paralympics